Chantelle is a commune in the Allier department in central France.

Geography
The village lies on the right bank of the Bouble, which forms most of the commune's northern border.

Population

See also
Communes of the Allier department

References

External links

Official Web site (in French)

Communes of Allier
Auvergne
Allier communes articles needing translation from French Wikipedia